Carpi is an Italian surname. Notable people with the surname include:

Aldo Carpi, Italian painter
Fabio Carpi, Italian film director
Fiorenzo Carpi (1918–1997), Italian composer and pianist
Giovan Battista Carpi, Italian comic artist
Jacopo Berengario da Carpi, Italian anatomist
Solomon Joseph Carpi (born 1715), Italian-Jewish writer
Zachariah Carpi, Italian-Jewish revolutionary

See also

Cari (name)
Carli (given name)

Italian-language surnames